Anchomenus cyaneus is a species of ground beetle in the Platyninae subfamily that can be found in Austria, France, Germany, Italy, Portugal, Spain and Switzerland.

Beetles described in 1828
Beetles of Europe
Taxa named by Pierre François Marie Auguste Dejean